Juan Carlos Martínez Camarena (born January 18, 1991, in Arandas, Jalisco) is a Mexican professional footballer who currently plays for Furia Roja. He made his professional debut with Guadalajara during a Primera División draw against Querétaro on 17 March 2012.

References

1991 births
Living people
C.D. Guadalajara footballers
Loros UdeC footballers
Coras de Nayarit F.C. footballers
Potros UAEM footballers
Liga MX players
Ascenso MX players
Liga Premier de México players
Tercera División de México players
Footballers from Jalisco
Association football forwards
Liga de Balompié Mexicano players
People from Arandas, Jalisco
Mexican footballers